Nebria capillosa is a species of ground beetle from Nebriinae subfamily that is endemic to Nepal.

References

capillosa
Beetles described in 1992
Beetles of Asia
Endemic fauna of Nepal